The Rankin Family (originally known as The Rankins) are a Canadian musical family group from Mabou, Nova Scotia. The group has won many Canadian music awards, including 15 East Coast Music Awards, six Juno Awards, four SOCAN Awards, three Canadian Country Music Awards and two Big Country Music Awards.

Career

Background
The Rankins come from a family of 12 siblings, all of whom would entertain the neighbours musically every third weekend as part of a cèilidh. The first Rankin Family band formed in the 1970s when siblings Geraldine, Genevieve, David, John Morris, and Raylene Rankin began performing at local weddings and dances in Cape Breton. As the older siblings went away to college and university, the younger siblings Jimmy, Cookie and Heather took their places.

1989 - 1999
Jimmy, John Morris, Cookie, Raylene and Heather Rankin released their own independent cassettes, The Rankin Family (1989) and Fare Thee Well Love (1990), featuring original songs and a combination of traditional jigs, reels and Celtic folk songs. These independent recordings were distributed by the Canadian independent folk music distribution company 'Soundwright' until the band's major label breakthrough with EMI. Their television debut was on the CBC Television variety show On the Road Again in 1989. EMI's re-release of Fare Thee Well Love in 1992, went quadruple platinum, selling over 500,000 copies; the title track was a Top 40 single in Canada.

In 1998 The Rankins first worked with The Chieftains on their album, Fire in the Kitchen, performing the Celtic song, "An Innis Aigh" (The Happy Isle). That year the band released an album, Uprooted, which had a country music flavour.

On September 17, 1999, after recording the song "Jimmy Mo Mhile Stor" with The Chieftains for their album, Tears of Stone, the group issued a press release stating that they would no longer perform as a group in order to pursue independent interests and careers.

2000 - present

On January 16, 2000, John Morris Rankin was killed in a car accident in Cape Breton Island. His daughter Molly Rankin is now a musician, and is lead vocalist and rhythm guitarist for the indie pop band Alvvays.

In the spring of 2000 Heather Rankin joined Carly Simon on her New York City promotional tour for Simon's record The Bedroom Tapes, and appeared with Simon on the Rosie O'Donnell show.

Jimmy Rankin has continued to write songs and has released five solo albums: Song Dog (2001), Handmade (2003), Edge of Day (2007), Forget About the World (2011), and Back Road Paradise (2014). Raylene Rankin released the solo albums Lambs in Spring (2004) and all the diamonds (2011). Heather Rankin released the solo albums A Fine Line (2016) and Imagine (2017); the first album included a cover of the Tears for Fears hit “Everybody Wants To Rule The World” featuring Halifax rapper, Quake Matthews. When not performing on their own, the sisters run The Red Shoe pub in Mabou.

One of the founders of the group, Geraldine Coyne (Rankin), died January 10, 2007, the result of a brain aneurysm, at her home in Calgary. She had not performed with the group since prior to the first recordings' being released.

On January 16, 2007, the album Reunion was released, and in 2009 the Rankin Family released their seventh studio album, These Are the Moments.

On June 3, 2012, Raylene Rankin appeared on CBC Radio's The Sunday Edition where she spoke about her decade-long struggle with cancer. She died of metastatic breast cancer on September 30, 2012. After funeral services in St. Thomas Aquinas Church in Halifax and St. Mary's Church in Mabou, she was buried in St. Mary's cemetery.

Members
 Jimmy Rankin  – vocals, guitar
 Cookie Rankin – vocals
 Heather Rankin – vocals

Former members
 Raylene Rankin (1960–2012) – vocals
 John Morris Rankin (1959–2000) – piano, fiddle
 David Rankin – vocals
 Geraldine Rankin (1958–2007) – vocals
 Genevieve Rankin – vocals

Discography

Studio albums
1989: The Rankin Family
1990: Fare Thee Well Love
1993: North Country
1995: Endless Seasons
1998: Uprooted
2007: Reunion
2009: These Are the Moments

Awards and nominations

References

External links

Article at canadianbands.com
The Red Shoe Pub site
 
 
 Article at thecanadianencyclopedia.ca
 Article at thecanadianencyclopedia.ca

Musical groups established in 1989
Musical groups from Nova Scotia
Canadian country music groups
Canadian folk music groups
Juno Award for Single of the Year winners
Family musical groups
Canadian Celtic music groups
Canadian families
People from Inverness County, Nova Scotia
Juno Award for Group of the Year winners
Canadian Country Music Association Rising Star Award winners
Canadian Country Music Association Group or Duo of the Year winners
Scottish-Canadian families